The , former  (OMSB), Osaka City Wind Orchestra, also known as Shion (市音, シオン) is a professional concert band based in Osaka, Japan. OMSB was established in 1923, which is the longest running wind orchestra in Japan. OMSB was under the direct management of the city of Osaka.

History 
The origin of OMSB is the  founded in 1888.

The IJA Fourth Division Band 
 February 28, 1888 - The attachment of the Third Military Band to the Osaka Garrison was determined.
 March 6, 1888 - The bandmaster and a fifty-piece military band took up their duties.
 May 14, 1888 - With the reorganization of the military system, the Osaka Garrison has been abolished and the fourth division was formed.
 March 25, 1923 - The 4th Division Band has disbanded due to disarmament. The farewell concert was held at the Tennouji Music Hall.

Osaka Municipal Symphonic Band 
 June 1, 1923 - Volunteers who were the former band members established . They managed the band under the membership system in those days. Funds for management were depended on a subsidy from Osaka city and earnings from requested performances.
 April 1, 1934 - OMSB came under the direct management of the city of Osaka, and all the members of OMSB became city officials.
 Since 1962 - OMSB has taken charge of recordings of an entrance march for the National High School Baseball Invitational Tournament every year.

Osaka City Wind Orchestra 
 April 1, 2014 - OMSB has been privatized as a general incorporated association. The English name has renamed as Osaka City Wind Orchestra.

Osaka Shion Wind Orchestra 
 July 1, 2014 - The English name has renamed as Osaka Shion Wind Orchestra.
 April 1, 2018 - The organization has been a public interest incorporated association.

Conductors 
 Hong-Jae Kim (1991 - 1994 Principal Conductor)
  (1995 - 1998 Principal Conductor)
 Shunsaku Tsutsumi (1998 - 2002　Artistic Adviser, Principal Conductor)
 Kazumasa Watanabe (2001 - 2002 Principal Guest Conductor)
 Kazuyoshi Akiyama (2003 - Special Conductor, Artistic Adviser)
 Kazuhiko Komatsu (2007 - 2013 Principal Guest Conductor)
 Akira Miyagawa (2010 - 2013 Artistic Director, 2014 - Music Director)
  (2017 - 2020 Resident Conductor)

External links 
  
 David G. Hebert (2012). "Wind Bands and Cultural Identity in Japanese Schools". Dordrecht and New York: Springer.

Music in Osaka
Wind bands
Musical groups established in 1923